Peter Neilson (1879 – 3 November 1948) was a New Zealand politician of the Labour Party.

Biography

Early life and career
He was born in Dunedin in 1879 and was educated locally at George Street Public School. He then became an apprentice baker before gaining employment at a local bakery firm. He was then a business partner of Jim Munro from 1914. When Munro was elected to Parliament in 1922 the partnership was dissolved and Nielson found employment as foreman at another bakery, which he held until 1935. He became a trade union member and was later president of the Dunedin Bakers' Union.

Member of Parliament

He had been active in the Socialist Party and Social Democratic Party, and had been a member of the Maori Hill Borough Council for four years. He was elected to the Dunedin City Council at the 1935 local-body elections, serving until 1938. Mayor Edwin Thoms Cox appointed Neilson chairman of the council's library committee for the triennium.

He was succeeded by fellow Labour member and future Minister of Defense Philip Connolly.

Later life and death
Neilson died on 3 November 1948 at Cook Hospital aged 69 after a three-week illness, survived by his wife and daughter. He was buried at Taruheru Cemetery, Gisborne.

Notes

References

1879 births
1948 deaths
New Zealand Labour Party MPs
New Zealand MPs for Dunedin electorates
New Zealand Socialist Party politicians
Social Democratic Party (New Zealand) politicians
Dunedin City Councillors
Unsuccessful candidates in the 1931 New Zealand general election
Members of the New Zealand House of Representatives
Burials at Taruheru Cemetery